Bonjo, or Impfondo, is a Gbaya language spoken by 3,000 people of the Republic of Congo. It is not classified in Moñino (2010), though it is listed with the southern Gbaya languages according to areal features.

References

Languages of the Republic of the Congo
Gbaya languages